Niedźwiedź (lit. bear) may refer to the following places in Poland:
Niedźwiedź, Lower Silesian Voivodeship (south-west Poland)
Niedźwiedź, Lipno County in Kuyavian-Pomeranian Voivodeship (north-central Poland)
Niedźwiedź, Świecie County in Kuyavian-Pomeranian Voivodeship (north-central Poland)
Niedźwiedź, Wąbrzeźno County in Kuyavian-Pomeranian Voivodeship (north-central Poland)
Niedźwiedź, Lublin Voivodeship (east Poland)
Niedźwiedź, Kraków County in Lesser Poland Voivodeship (south Poland)
Niedźwiedź, Limanowa County in Lesser Poland Voivodeship (south Poland)
Niedźwiedź, Kielce County in Świętokrzyskie Voivodeship (south-central Poland)
Niedźwiedź, Staszów County in Świętokrzyskie Voivodeship (south-central Poland)
Niedźwiedź, Masovian Voivodeship (east-central Poland)
Niedźwiedź, Greater Poland Voivodeship (west-central Poland)
Niedźwiedź, Lubusz Voivodeship (west Poland)
Niedźwiedź, Warmian-Masurian Voivodeship (north Poland)
Niedźwiedź, West Pomeranian Voivodeship (north-west Poland)